Acrotaphus is a genus of ichneumon wasps in the family Ichneumonidae. There are about 26 described species in Acrotaphus. They are parasitoids of Araneidae and Tetragnathidae spider families.

Species
These 26 species belong to the genus Acrotaphus:
 Acrotaphus amajari (Pádua, 2020) 
 Acrotaphus amazonicus (Pádua & Sääksjärvi, 2020)
 Acrotaphus bodoquenaensis (Pádua, 2020)
 Acrotaphus chedelae (Gauld, 1991) c g
 Acrotaphus cuzconus (Pádua & Sääksjärvi, 2020)
 Acrotaphus dolichopus (Pádua, 2020)
 Acrotaphus fasciatus (Brulle, 1846) c g
 Acrotaphus fascipennis (Cresson, 1865) c
 Acrotaphus ferruginosus (Cresson, 1865) c g
 Acrotaphus franklini (Gauld, 1991) c g
 Acrotaphus fuscipennis (Cresson, 1865) c b
 Acrotaphus homeofranklini (Pádua, 2020)
 Acrotaphus jackiechani (Pádua & Sääksjärvi, 2020)
 Acrotaphus japi (Higa & Penteado-Dias, 2019)
 Arcotaphus kourou (Pádua & Sääksjärvi, 2020)
 Acrotaphus latifasciatus (Cameron, 1911) c g
 Acrotaphus mexicanus (Cameron, 1886) c
 Acrotaphus micrus (Pádua, 2020)
 Acrotaphus monotaenius (Pádua, 2020)
 Acrotaphus nambilloensis (Pádua, 2020)
 Acrotaphus pseudoamazonicus (Pádua & Sääksjärvi, 2020)
 Acrotaphus pseudomexicanus (Pádua, 2020)
 Acrotaphus tibialis (Cameron, 1886) c g
 Acrotaphus venezuelanus (Pádua, 2020)
 Acrotaphus wiltii (Cresson, 1870) c g b
 Acrotaphus zampieronae (Pádua, 2020)
Data sources: i = ITIS, c = Catalogue of Life, g = GBIF, b = Bugguide.net

References

Further reading

 
 

Pimplinae